Magnus Erlingsson (1156 – 15 June 1184) was a king of Norway (being Magnus V) during the civil war era in Norway. He was the first known Scandinavian monarch to be crowned in Scandinavia. He helped to establish primogeniture in royal succession in Norway. King Magnus was killed in the Battle of Fimreite in 1184 against the forces of Sverre Sigurdsson who became King of Norway.

Biography
Magnus Erlingsson was probably born in Etne in Hordaland. He was the son of Erling Skakke, a Norwegian nobleman who earned his reputation crusading with Rögnvald Kali Kolsson, the earl of Orkney. Magnus's mother, Kristin, was the daughter of Sigurd the Crusader, who was the king of Norway from 1103 to 1130.  Magnus Erlingsson was named king in 1161 at the age of five. He was the first Norwegian king to be crowned. His father Erling took the title of earl and held the real power since Magnus was a minor. Erling Skakke  continued to be the country’s real ruler even after Magnus had come of age.

In 1166, Sigurd Agnhatt and his foster son Olav Ugjæva raised a force in Oppland, and had Olav proclaimed king, while Earl Erling Skakke was away in Denmark. Olav was the son of Maria Øysteinsdotter, the daughter of former King Øystein Magnusson. After Erling returned to Norway to fight this uprising, Olav and his men attacked Erling in an ambush at Rydjokul in Sørum. Erling was wounded and barely escaped. In 1168 Olav and his men ventured south to the Oslofjord area, but were there defeated in battle at Stanger in Våler. Sigurd was killed in the battle, but Olav escaped and went to Denmark.<ref>[http://www.snl.no/.nbl_biografi/Magnus_5_Erlingsson/utdypning Magnus 5 Erlingsson' (Store norske leksikon)]</ref>

Magnus' reign saw the arrival in Norway of Sverre Sigurdsson, who claimed the throne for himself as an allegedly illegitimate son of a previous king. In June 1177, Sverre first led his men to Trøndelag where Sverre was proclaimed as king. Erling's position was compromised and he fell at the Battle of Kalvskinnet outside Nidaros in 1179. 

Several more years of warfare ended with Magnus' defeat and death in the Battle of Fimreite on June 15, 1184. Sverre attacked Magnus' fleet sending his ships into battle in squadrons, to charge and overwhelm on one ship at a time, forcing the Magnus' men to jump over to the next. As the battle proceeded, the remaining ships became extremely crammed, and then started to go down because of the weight. King Magnus is reported to have gone down on one of the last of them.

Historic context
The civil war era in Norway would not end with the victory of Sverre over Magnus. After the death of Magnus, Sigurd Magnusson, Inge Magnusson and Erling Magnusson Steinvegg came forth all stating to be sons of Magnus and claiming the Norwegian throne. The civil war era in Norway extended over a 110-year period. It started with the death of King Sigurd I of Norway in 1130 and ended with the death of Duke Skule Baardsson in 1240.

During this period there were several interlocked conflicts of varying scale and intensity. The background for these conflicts was the unclear Norwegian succession laws, social conditions and the struggle between Church and King. There were then two main parties, firstly known by varying names or no names at all, but finally condensed into parties of Bagler and Birkebeiner. The rallying point regularly was a royal son, who was set up as the head figure of the party in question, to oppose the rule of king from the contesting party.

References

Other sources
Snorre Sturlason, The Heimskringla: A History of the Norse Kings, vol. 3 (London: Norroena Society, 1907)
Finlay, Alison editor and translator Fagrskinna, a Catalogue of the Kings of Norway (Brill Academic. 2004)
 Gjerset,  Knut History of the Norwegian People  (The MacMillan Company,  Volume I. 1915)
Heggland,  Johannes Den unge kongen''  (Eide Forlag, 1999) Norwegian

1156 births
1184 deaths
12th-century Norwegian monarchs
People from Etne
Norwegian civil wars
Monarchs killed in action
Medieval child monarchs
Norwegian military personnel killed in the Norwegian civil wars
House of Hardrada